The 1949 WANFL season was the 65th season of senior football in Perth, Western Australia.

Ladder

Grand final

References

West Australian Football League seasons
WANFL